SaudiGulf Airlines (Arabic: السعودية الخليجية) was a carrier located in Dammam. It was owned by the Al Qahtani Group and became the country's third International carrier, after Saudia and Flynas.

History
SaudiGulf Airlines was established in 2013 by Abdel Hadi Abdullah Al-Qahtani & Sons Group of Companies, a Saudi consortium of privately owned businesses. The airline was planning to start operation in 2015 but encountered regulatory delays with Saudi Arabia’s General Authority of Civil Aviation. The airline received its air operator's certificate on 22 June 2016. It launched operations on 29 October 2016 with twice daily flights between Dammam and Riyadh. 

On 28 March 2019 SaudiGulf announced the cancellation of its 16 A220-300 orders. This came after an order for 10 A320neos, which SaudiGulf stated would be a better fit for the airline. The first Airbus A320neo was built, registered as VP-CGE, but not delivered as airline operations were suspended due to COVID-19 on 3 June 2020 and the company filed for bankruptcy afterward.

Destinations
SaudiGulf Airlines flew to the following destinations as of October 2018:

Fleet

SaudiGulf Airlines operated the following aircraft at the time of its demise:

References

External links

 

Defunct airlines of Saudi Arabia
Airlines established in 2013
Airlines disestablished in 2020
Transport in Dammam
Companies based in Dammam
Saudi Arabian companies established in 2013
2013 establishments in Saudi Arabia